List by departments of the senators of Senate of France (2014-2017) elected in the various renewals.

List of senators by departments

See also
 Senate of France

References

List
Senators